Thomas Kingsbury  was an Anglican priest in Ireland during the 19th century.

Kingsbury was born in Dublin and educated at Trinity College there. A prebendary of Ballysadare in Achonry Cathedral, he was Archdeacon of Killala from 1818 until his death in 1846.

Notes

Alumni of Trinity College Dublin
Church of Ireland priests
19th-century Irish Anglican priests
Christian clergy from Dublin (city)
1847 deaths
Archdeacons of Killala